Thailand competed at the 1984 Summer Olympics in Los Angeles, United States.  The nation returned to the Summer Games after participating in the American-led boycott of the 1980 Summer Olympics.

Medalists

Results by event

Archery

Men's Individual Competition
 Amphol Amalekajorn – 2342 points (→ 46th place)
 Wachera Piyapattra – 2328 points (→ 50th place)

Athletics

Women's 100 metres
 Wallapa Tangjitnusom
 First Heat — 12.18s (→ did not advance)

Women's Long Jump
Sarinee Phenglaor
 Qualification — 5.51 m (→ did not advance, 22nd place)

Boxing

Sailing

Shooting

References
Official Olympic Reports
International Olympic Committee results database

Nations at the 1984 Summer Olympics
1984
1984 in Thai sport